Marquess of Zetland is a title in the Peerage of the United Kingdom. It was created on 22 August 1892 for the former Lord Lieutenant of Ireland, Lawrence Dundas, 3rd Earl of Zetland. Zetland is an archaic form of Shetland. The Dundas family descends from the wealthy Scottish businessman and Member of Parliament, Lawrence Dundas. In 1762 he was created a Baronet, of Kerse in the County of Linlithgow, in the Baronetage of Great Britain. The title was created with remainder, failing heirs male of his own, to his brother Thomas Dundas and the heirs male of his body. He was succeeded by his son, the second Baronet. He represented Richmond and Stirling in the House of Commons and also served as Lord Lieutenant of Orkney and Shetland. In 1794 he was created Baron Dundas, of Aske in the North Riding of the County of York, in the Peerage of Great Britain. Lord Dundas notably purchased the right to the earldom of Orkney and lordship of Zetland from James Douglas, 14th Earl of Morton.

His son, the second Baron, was a Member of Parliament for Richmond and also served as Lord Lieutenant of Orkney and Shetland. In 1838 he was created Earl of Zetland in the Peerage of the United Kingdom. He was succeeded by his eldest son, the second Earl. He also represented Richmond and York in Parliament and served as Lord Lieutenant of the North Riding of Yorkshire. On his death, the titles passed to his nephew, the third Earl. At first a Liberal, he held minor office in the second administration of William Ewart Gladstone but later joined the Conservative Party and served from 1889 to 1892 as Lord Lieutenant of Ireland. The latter year he was honoured when he was made Earl of Ronaldshay, in the County of Orkney and Zetland, and Marquess of Zetland. The Earl of Ronaldshay is the courtesy title of the eldest son and heir of the Marquess. He was succeeded by his son, the second Marquess. He was also a prominent politician and served as Governor of Bengal and as Secretary of State for India.  the titles are held by his grandson, the fourth Marquess, who succeeded his father in 1989.

The family seat is Aske Hall, Richmond, North Yorkshire.

Dundas Baronets, of Kerse (1762)
Sir Lawrence Dundas, 1st Baronet (1710–1781)
Sir Thomas Dundas, 2nd Baronet (1741–1820) (created Baron Dundas in 1794)

Barons Dundas (1794)
Thomas Dundas, 1st Baron Dundas (1741–1820)
Lawrence Dundas, 2nd Baron Dundas (1766–1839) (created Earl of Zetland in 1838)

Earls of Zetland (1838)
Other titles (1st Earl onwards): Baron Dundas (GB 1794)
Lawrence Dundas, 1st Earl of Zetland (1766–1839)
Thomas Dundas, 2nd Earl of Zetland  (1795–1873)
Lawrence Dundas, 3rd Earl of Zetland  (1844–1929) (created Marquess of Zetland in 1892)

Marquesses of Zetland (1892)
Other titles (1st Marquess onwards): Earl of Zetland (UK 1838), Earl of Ronaldshay (UK 1892), Baron Dundas (GB 1794) 
Lawrence Dundas, 1st Marquess of Zetland  (1844–1929)
Lawrence John Lumley Dundas, 2nd Marquess of Zetland (1876–1961)
Lawrence Aldred Mervyn Dundas, 3rd Marquess of Zetland (1908–1989)
Lawrence Mark Dundas, 4th Marquess of Zetland (b. 1937)

The heir apparent is the present holder's eldest son Robin Lawrence Dundas, Earl of Ronaldshay (b. 1965).
The heir apparent's heir presumptive is his brother Lord James Edward Dundas (b. 1967).
The heir apparent's heir presumptive's heir apparent is his son Milo James Dundas (b. 1998).

Line of succession (simplified)

  Rt. Hon. Sir Lawrence Dundas of Kerse, 1st Baronet (c. 1710 – 1781)
  Thomas Dundas, 1st Baron Dundas (1741–1820)
  Lawrence Dundas, 1st Earl of Zetland (1766–1839)
 The Hon. John Charles Dundas (1808–1866)
  Lawrence Dundas, 1st Marquess of Zetland (1844–1929)
  Lawrence John Lumley Dundas, 2nd Marquess of Zetland (1876–1961)
  Lawrence Aldred Mervyn Dundas, 3rd Marquess of Zetland (1908–1989)
  Lawrence Mark Dundas, 4th Marquess of Zetland (born 1937)
 (1) Robin Lawrence Dundas, Earl of Ronaldshay (born 1965)
 (2) Lord James Edward Dundas (born 1967)
 (3) Milo James Dundas (born 1998)
 (4) Lord David Paul Nicholas Dundas (born 1945)
 (5) Thomas Harry Django Dundas (born 1981)
 (6) Finn Arthur Ebenezer Dundas (born 2000)
 (7) Lord Richard Bruce Dundas (born 1951)
 (8) Max Charles Dundas (born 1978)
 (9) Alexander Lawrence Francis Dundas (born 1999)
 The Hon. John Charles Dundas (1845–1892)
 Frederick James Dundas (1877–1950)
 G/Capt. Sir Hugh Spencer Lisle Dundas (1920–1995)
male issue in succession to earldom and barony
 The Hon. William Fitzwilliam James Dundas (1860–1945)
 Robert Bruce Dundas (1900–1980)
male issue in succession to earldom and barony
 The Hon. Cospatrick Thomas Dundas (1862–1906)
 Vice-Admiral John George Lawrence Dundas (1893–1952)
male issue in succession to earldom and barony

References

Kidd, Charles, Williamson, David (editors). Debrett's Peerage and Baronetage (1990 edition). New York: St Martin's Press, 1990.

External links
Aske Hall

Marquessates in the Peerage of the United Kingdom
Noble titles created in 1892
Noble titles created for UK MPs
 
Clan Dundas